Arnaud Boetsch was the defending champion, but did not participate this year.

Richard Krajicek won the tournament, beating Karsten Braasch in the final, 6–3, 6–4.

Seeds

Draw

Finals

Top half

Bottom half

References

 Main Draw

Rosmalen Grass Court Championships
1994 ATP Tour